STUB1 (STIP1 homology and U-Box containing protein 1) is a human gene that codes for the protein CHIP (C terminus of HSC70-Interacting Protein).

Function 
The CHIP protein encoded by this gene binds to and inhibits the ATPase activity of the chaperone proteins HSC70 and HSP70 and blocks the forward reaction of the HSC70-HSP70 substrate-binding cycle. In addition, CHIP possesses E3 ubiquitin ligase activity and promotes ubiquitylation, mainly of chaperone-bound misfolded proteins.

CHIP enhances HSP70 induction during acute stress and also mediates its turnover during the stress recovery process. Hence CHIP appears to maintain protein homeostasis by controlling chaperone levels during stress and recovery.

Mutations in STUB1 cause spinocerebellarataxiatype 16.

Interactions 

STUB1 has been shown to interact with:

 C-Raf, 
 DNAJB1, 
 HSPA1A, 
 HSPA4,
 HSPA8, 
 Parkin (ligase),  and
 RUNX2.

References

Further reading

External links